Evelyn Tubb is an English soprano, and long-time member of The Consort of Musicke and one of the world's greatest early music specialists, known for her innovative and original performances.

Life
She originally comes from the Isle of Wight and studied piano, trumpet, violin and singing. After earning the Associate and Graduate Diploma at the Guildhall School of Music and Drama and a B Mus at what was then Trent Park college of education, she continued working at Barclay school as part time class music teacher, and formed a brass department in a girls' school in Kings Langley Hertfordshire.  
She has been a member of The Consort of Musicke, since 1978.

She also taught at the Schola Cantorum Basiliensis in Basel, Switzerland from 1997 until 2018 and continues to present masterclasses throughout the world.

Discography 
  biography, discography for Evelyn Tubb
 Dido and Aeneas (Edition Lilac CD, 2004)
 Ordo Virtutum (Etcetera Record Company BV CD 1995 KTC 1203; also VHS 1997)
 Hildegard von Bingen In Portrait (double  DVD OA 0874 D, published by BBC Opus Arte 2003)
 Pergolesi: Stabat Mater (Edition Lilac LILAC151108-2, Release Date: 2015)
 Monteverdi: Il ottavo libro de madrigali, 1638 Madrigali guerrieri et amorosi (Erato 5615702, 2000)

References

External links 
 Hyperion Records; artist's page for Evelyn Tubb
 Evelyn Tubb at Bach Cantatas Website
 New Trinity Baroque: artist's page for Evelyn Tubb
 Evelyn Tubb at Fischer Artists
 Vox Animae official site
 Ordo Virtutum DVD

1954 births
Living people
Musicians from the Isle of Wight
Academic staff of Schola Cantorum Basiliensis
English operatic sopranos
British performers of early music
Women performers of early music
Alumni of the Guildhall School of Music and Drama
20th-century English women singers
20th-century English singers
21st-century English women singers
21st-century English singers
English expatriates in Switzerland